James Cosgrave (12 September 1865 – 18 April 1936; surname also spelt as Cosgrove) was an Irish nationalist politician, and also one of the few parliamentarians who served in the House of Commons of the United Kingdom and in Dáil Éireann.

Born in Skehanagh, Eyrecourt, County Galway, he was the son of Michael Cosgrave and Margaret Kirwan.

He was returned unopposed as Member of Parliament for East Galway in the 4 December 1914 by-election for the Irish Parliamentary Party on the death of John Roche. He did not contest the 1918 general election, and the seat was won by Liam Mellows of Sinn Féin.

He successfully ran as an Independent Nationalist at the 1923 general election and was elected for the Galway constituency. At the 1927 June and September 1927 elections, he unsuccessfully ran as a National League Party candidate.

In later years, he was associated with Fianna Fáil. He was later a member of Galway County Council and chairman of Ballinasloe Mental Hospital Committee.

Cosgrave remarried in 1923 and moved to Dublin, where he died at his residence at Baggot House, 91 Lower Baggot St. He is buried in Quansboro, Killimor, County Galway.

References

Sources
"Mr. James Cosgrove, Skehanagh, Eyrecourt", Connacht Tribune, 25 April 1936.

External links

 

1936 deaths
Irish Parliamentary Party MPs
Members of the Parliament of the United Kingdom for County Galway constituencies (1801–1922)
National League Party politicians
Local councillors in County Galway
Politicians from County Galway
UK MPs 1910–1918
Fianna Fáil politicians
Independent TDs
Members of the 4th Dáil
1865 births